Robert Charles "Bob" Bell (August 16, 1926 – February 10, 2014) was an American politician and attorney.

Background 
Born in Saint Paul, Minnesota, Bell served in the United States Army during World War II. He graduated from University of Minnesota Law School in 1950. Bell was a state representative from 1966-74 for Roseville area. He practiced law and served as the Roseville City Attorney for 36 years. He served as special assistant Ramsey County attorney for Long Lake Regional Park acquisition. He was a Ramsey County Charter commission member from 2000-08. He was a Rotary club Paul Harris Fellow.

He was a member of the Republican Party. Bell served in the Minnesota House of Representatives from 1967 to 1974.

Notes

1926 births
2014 deaths
Politicians from Saint Paul, Minnesota
People from Roseville, Minnesota
Military personnel from Minnesota
University of Minnesota Law School alumni
Minnesota lawyers
Republican Party members of the Minnesota House of Representatives
20th-century American lawyers